Taschereau is a municipality in northwestern Quebec, Canada in the Abitibi-Ouest Regional County Municipality. It covers 246.97 km² and had a population of 898 as of the Canada 2021 Census.

The municipality was incorporated on December 27, 2001.

Demographics
Population trend:
 Population in 2021: 898 (2016 to 2021 population change: -6.7%)
 Population in 2016: 963 
 Population in 2011: 981 
 Population in 2006: 996
 Population total in 2001: 1048
 Taschereau (village): 534
 Taschereau (municipality): 514
 Population in 1996:
 Taschereau (village): 641
 Taschereau (municipality): 460 (or 534 when adjusted to 2001 boundaries)
 Population in 1991:
 Taschereau (village): 684
 Taschereau (municipality): 476

Private dwellings occupied by usual residents: 425 (total dwellings: 460)

Mother tongue:
 English as first language: 0%
 French as first language: 100%
 English and French as first language: 0%
 Other as first language: 0%

Municipal council
 Mayor: Manon Luneau
 Councillors: Julien Chalifoux, Jocelyne Deschênes, Pascal Houle, Henri Lampron, Louis-Georges  Lemire, Louise Paquin,

References

Municipalities in Quebec
Incorporated places in Abitibi-Témiscamingue
Designated places in Quebec
Populated places established in 1911